Teleceiba, also known as Canal 7, is a television station located in La Ceiba, Honduras.

External links

Teleceiba at LyngSat Address
Teleceiba Canal 7 Live on Honduras 504

References

Television in Honduras
Spanish-language television stations
Mass media in La Ceiba